Piotrków Governorate was one of the administrative divisions in the Kingdom of Poland, established in 1867 by splitting some areas of the Radom and Warsaw Governorates. Its capital was in Petrokov in modern day Piotrków Trybunalski.

History
It was created in 1867, split off from parts of Radom and Warsaw Governorates. It consisted of uzeyds of Będzin, Częstochowa, Radomsko and Łódź.

Language
By the Imperial census of 1897. In bold are languages spoken by more people than the state language.

References and notes

Further reading
 

 
Governorates of Congress Poland
States and territories established in 1867
1860s establishments in Poland